Cyperus atractocarpus is a species of sedge that is native to parts of south western Africa.

See also 
 List of Cyperus species

References 

atractocarpus
Plants described in 1884
Flora of Zambia
Flora of Angola
Taxa named by Henry Nicholas Ridley